M. Ramanathan (1934/1935 – May 10, 2019) was an Indian politician and former Member of the Legislative Assembly of Tamil Nadu. He was elected to the Tamil Nadu legislative assembly as a Dravida Munnetra Kazhagam candidate from Coimbatore West constituency in 1984 and 1989 elections.

He died on 10 May 2019, at the age of 84.

References 

1930s births
2019 deaths
Dravida Munnetra Kazhagam politicians
India MPs 1996–1997
Lok Sabha members from Tamil Nadu
Politicians from Coimbatore
Year of birth uncertain
Tamil Nadu MLAs 1985–1989